Aplanodes is a genus of true bugs belonging to the family Delphacidae.

Species:
 Aplanodes australiae (Kirkaldy, 1907)

References

Delphacidae